Andrzej Mostowski (1 November 1913 – 22 August 1975) was a Polish mathematician. He is perhaps best remembered for the Mostowski collapse lemma.

Biography
Born in Lemberg, Austria-Hungary, Mostowski entered University of Warsaw in 1931. He was influenced by Kuratowski, Lindenbaum, and Tarski. His Ph.D. came in 1939, officially directed by Kuratowski but in practice directed by Tarski who was a young lecturer at that time.

He became an accountant after the German invasion of Poland but continued working in the Underground Warsaw University. After the Warsaw uprising of 1944, the Nazis tried to put him in a concentration camp. With the help of some Polish nurses, he escaped to a hospital, choosing to take bread with him rather than his notebook containing his research. Some of this research he reconstructed after the War, however much of it remained lost.

His work was largely on recursion theory and undecidability. From 1946 until his death in Vancouver, British Columbia, Canada, he worked at the University of Warsaw. Much of his work, during that time, was on first order logic and model theory.

His son Tadeusz is also a mathematician working on differential geometry. With Krzysztof Kurdyka and Adam Parusinski, Tadeusz Mostowski solved René Thom's gradient conjecture in 2000.

See also
List of Polish People
Mostowski model

Works

Books 
 1968 & 1976: (with Kazimierz Kuratowski) Set Theory. With an Introduction to Descriptive Set Theory, Studies in Logic and Foundations of Mathematics #86, North Holland, 
 1952: Sentences Undecidable in Formalized Arithmetic: An Exposition of the Theory of Kurt Godel, North-Holland, Amsterdam, 
 1969: Constructible Sets with Applications, North-Holland, Amsterdam.

Papers 

 Andrzej Mostowski, "Über die Unabhängigkeit des Wohlordnungssatzes vom Ordnungsprinzip." Fundamenta Mathematicae Vol. 32, No.1, ss. 201-252, (1939).
 Andrzej Mostowski, "On definable sets of positive integers", Fundamenta Mathematicae Vol. 34, No. 1, ss. 81-112, (1947).
 Andrzej Mostowski, "Un théorème sur les nombres cos 2πk/n", Colloquium Mathematicae Vol. 1, No. 3, ss. 195-196, (1948).
 Casimir Kuratowski, Andrzej Mostowski, "Sur un problème de la théorie des groupes et son rapport à la topologie", Colloquium Mathematicae Vol. 2, No. 3-4, ss. 212-215, (1951).
 Andrzej Mostowski, "Groups connected with Boolean algebras. (Partial solution of the problem P92)", Colloquium Mathematicae Vol. 2, No. 3-4, ss. 216-219, (1951).
 Andrzej Mostowski, "On direct products of theories", Journal of Symbolic Logic, Vol. 17, No. 1, ss. 1-31, (1952).
 Andrzej Mostowski, "Models of axiomatic systems", Fundamenta Mathematicae Vol. 39, No. 1, ss. 133-158, (1952).
 Andrzej Mostowski, "On a system of axioms which has no recursively enumerable arithmetic model", Fundamenta Mathematicae Vol. 40, No. 1, ss. 56-61, (1953).
 Andrzej Mostowski, "A formula with no recursively enumerable model", Fundamenta Mathematicae Vol. 42, No. 1, ss. 125-140, (1955).
 Andrzej Mostowski, "Examples of sets definable by means of two and three quantifiers", Fundamenta Mathematicae Vol. 42, No. 2, ss. 259-270, (1955).
 Andrzej Mostowski, "Contributions to the theory of definable sets and functions", Fundamenta Mathematicae Vol. 42, No. 2, ss. 271-275, (1955).
 Andrzej Ehrenfeucht, Andrzej Mostowski, "Models of Axiomatic Theories Admitting Automorphisms", Fundamenta Mathematicae, Vol. 43, No. 1, ss. 50-68 (1956).
 Andrzej Mostowski, "L'oeuvre scientifique de Jan Łukasiewicz dans le domaine de la logique mathématique", Fundamenta Mathematicae Vol. 44, No. 1, ss. 1-11, (1957).
 Andrzej Mostowski, "On a generalization of quantifiers", Fundamenta Mathematicae Vol. 44, No. 1, ss. 12-36, (1957).
 Andrzej Mostowski, "On computable sequences", Fundamenta Mathematicae Vol. 44, No. 1, ss. 37-51, (1957).
 Andrzej Grzegorczyk, Andrzej Mostowski and Czesław Ryll-Nardzewski, "The classical and ω-complete arithmetic", Journal of Symbolic Logic Vol. 23, No. 2, ss. 188-206, (1958).
 Andrzej Mostowski, "On a problem of W. Kinna and K. Wagner", Colloquium Mathematicae Vol. 6, No. 1, ss. 207-208, (1958).
 Andrzej Mostowski, "A generalization of the incompleteness theorem", Fundamenta Mathematicae Vol. 49, No. 2, ss. 205-232, (1961).
 Andrzej Mostowski, "Axiomatizability of some many valued predicate calculi", Fundamenta Mathematicae Vol. 50, No. 2, ss. 165-190, (1961).
 Yoshindo Suzuki, Andrzej Mostowski, "On ω-models which are not β-models", Fundamenta Mathematicae Vol. 65, No. 1, ss. 83-93, (1969).

References

External links
 
 Stanislaw Krejewski & Marian Srebrny On the Life and Work of Andrzek Mostowski

1913 births
1975 deaths
Scientists from Lviv
20th-century Polish mathematicians
Polish set theorists
Polish logicians
University of Warsaw alumni
Academic staff of the University of Warsaw
20th-century Polish philosophers
Recipients of the State Award Badge (Poland)